Shona Thorburn (born August 7, 1982) is a Canadian professional basketball player, formerly a point guard for the Seattle Storm of the WNBA.

Thorburn is a graduate of Westdale Secondary School in Hamilton, Ontario. She later attended college at the University of Utah and graduated in 2006. Following her collegiate career, she was selected 7th overall in the 2006 WNBA Draft by the Minnesota Lynx.

Most of Thorburn's rookie season was spent on the bench.  She never got into the Lynx rotation and averaged just 0.8 points, 0.9 assists and 6.6 minutes in 21 games.  On May 14, 2007, she was released by the Lynx.

Thorburn inked a 7-day contract with the Seattle Storm in July 2007, but was released when the term expired.

FIBA
She was invited to join the national team, to play in the 2013 FIBA Americas Championship for Women, held in Xalapa, Mexico from 21 to 28 September 2013. She averaged 3.5 points and 3.3 rebounds per game, and helped the Canadian National team to a second place, silver medal finish. Canada faced Cuba in a preliminary round and won 53–40, but in the championship game, Cuba prevailed 79–71.

Pam Am games 2015
Thorburn was a member of the Canada women's national basketball team which participated in basketball at the 2015 Pan American Games held in Toronto, Ontario, Canada July 10 to 26, 2015. Canada opened the preliminary rounds with an easy 101–38 win over Venezuela. The following day they beat Argentina 73–58. The final preliminary game was against Cuba; both teams were 2–0, so the winner would win the group. The game went down to the wire with Canada eking out a 71–68 win. Canada would face Brazil in the semifinal.

Everything seemed to go right in the semifinal game. Canada opened the game with an 11–2 run on seven consecutive points by Miranda Ayim. Langlois contributed five assists. In the third quarter Canada strongly out rebounded Brazil and hit 69% of their field goals to score 33 points in the quarter. Lizanne Murphy and Nirra Fields hit three-pointers to help extend the lead to 68–39 at the end of three quarters. Canada continued to dominate in the fourth quarter with three-pointers by Kia Nurse and Kim Gaucher. Canada went on to win the game 91–63 to earn a spot in the gold-medal game against the USA.

The gold-medal game matched up the host team Canada against USA, in a sold-out arena dominated by fans in red and white and waving the Canadian flag. The Canadian team, arm in arm, sang Oh Canada as the respective national anthems were played.

After trading baskets early the US edged out to a double-digit lead in the second quarter. However the Canadians, spurred on by the home crowd cheering, fought back and tied up the game at halftime. In the third quarter, it was Canada's time to shine as they outscore the US 26–15. The lead would reach as high as 18 points. The USA would fight back, but not all the way and Canada won the game and the gold-medal 81–73. It was Canada's first gold-medal in basketball in the Pan Am games. Nurse was the star for Canada with 33 points, hitting 11 of her 12 free-throw attempts in 10 of her 17 field-goal attempts including two of three three-pointers.

Honours
In 2012 Thorburn was awarded the Queen Elizabeth II Diamond Jubilee Medal.

WNBA career statistics

Regular season

|-
| align="left" | 2006
| align="left" | Minnesota
| 22 || 0 || 6.5 || .185 || .125 || .625 || 0.8 || 0.9 || 0.2 || 0.1 || 0.6 || 0.7
|-
| align="left" | 2007
| align="left" | Seattle
| 2 || 0 || 4.0 || .500 || .000 || .000 || 0.5 || 0.0 || 0.0 || 0.0 || 1.0 || 1.0
|-
| align="left" | Career
| align="left" | 2 years, 2 teams
| 24 || 0 || 6.3 || .207 || .125 || .625 || 0.8 || 0.8 || 0.2 || 0.1 || 0.7 || 0.8

University of Utah statistics

References

External links
WNBA Player Profile

1982 births
Living people
Basketball people from Ontario
Basketball players at the 2003 Pan American Games
Basketball players at the 2012 Summer Olympics
Basketball players at the 2015 Pan American Games
Basketball players at the 2016 Summer Olympics
British expatriate basketball people in Spain
British expatriate basketball people in the United States
Canadian expatriate basketball people in the United States
Canadian expatriate basketball people in Spain
Canadian women's basketball players
English women's basketball players
Minnesota Lynx draft picks
Minnesota Lynx players
Olympic basketball players of Canada
Pan American Games gold medalists for Canada
Pan American Games medalists in basketball
Point guards
Seattle Storm players
Sportspeople from Hamilton, Ontario
Sportspeople from Oxford
Utah Utes women's basketball players
Medalists at the 2015 Pan American Games